Crime in Honduras has become a growing matter of concern for the Honduran population in recent years. Honduras has experienced very high levels of violence and criminality. Homicide violence reached a peak in 2012 with an average of 20 homicides a day.

Crime by type

Murder 
In 2012 Honduras had the highest murder rate in its history. It also had the highest murder rate in a non-war country. In 2012, 7172 homicides were recorded. On average, there were 20 homicides a day. There was a 6.2% increase in homicides compared to the previous year. 83.4% of these homicides were committed with firearms.

The main perpetrators of these crimes are young men between 15 and 34 years and who are typically members of gangs like the Mara Salvatrucha or Barrio 18. The main victims of these crimes have been young people as well. This targeted violence is the reason behind the rise in youth migration in the past years.

Between 2011 and 2015 the murder rate in Honduras decreased by 30% (rate claimed by government, not independently confirmed). Homicides went down from 88.5 per 100,000 residents to 60.0 per 100,000. Homicide rate decrease stopped in 2016 when the murder rate did not present any significant differences from 2015. In the first semester of 2016 a rate of 14 deaths per day equalled the murder rate in 2015. Murder rate decrease has been attributed to different reasons such as negotiations and agreements between criminal groups and government action, economic aid given by United States Agency for International Development  to fund crime prevention programs and to the Mano Dura Laws. It is not clear which of these has caused the decrease in homicides.

Due to the high levels of impunity in the country, the  majority of murders in Honduras are never punished. In recent years only 4% of homicides have ended in a conviction. The lack of justice has produced a lack of trust in the police and other authority figures, which is not good for creating civic participation. The fear and insecurity, created by violence, that exists among the Honduran population has also been an obstacle for organizations focused on crime prevention because there is barely any active or social participation to support these organizations.

Illegal drug trade 
Honduras is considered a major drug route to the US. Smuggling is said to have increased after the US suspended anti-drug support following the 2009 Honduran coup d'état. Weak domestic law enforcement institutions make Honduras a popular point of entry for drug routes through Central America.

In December 2009 the head of Honduras' anti-drug smuggling operations,  Gen Julian Aristides Gonzalez, was assassinated in Tegucigalpa. Journalist David Meza was assassinated in March 2010; he investigated drug trafficking within Honduras and, according to the El Tiempo newspaper, received death threats in 2010. Another reporter, Nahúm Elí Palacios Arteaga, was also assassinated in March 2010.

Historical
In 1978 Policarpo Paz García overthrew Juan Alberto Melgar Castro in a "cocaine coup" financed by the Medellín Cartel-linked drug lord Juan Matta-Ballesteros. The CIA took "a close and friendly interest" in the coup as Paz, unlike Melgar, was a keen supporter of Nicaragua's Anastasio Somoza Debayle. Under Paz, the Honduran army and intelligence service received a cut of Matta-Ballesteros' profits in return for protection, as Honduras became a major shipment route for cocaine and marijuana from Colombia. When the US Drug Enforcement Administration set up its first office in Tegucigalpa in 1981, its resident agent "rapidly came to the accurate conclusion that the entire Honduran government was deeply involved in the drug trade."

The head of Honduran military intelligence, Leonides Torres Arias, formed a link between Matta-Ballesteros and the CIA, and in 1983 Matta-Ballesteros' airline SETCO (Services Ejectutivos Turistas Commander) received its first contract to ship arms from the United States to the Nicaraguan Contras, even as it was known that SETCO was smuggling cocaine into the US. This would later develop into the Iran-Contra Affair.

In 1988 Matta-Ballesteros was taken from his home in Tegucigalpa by United States Marshals, sent to the United States for trial, and convicted of the kidnap and assassination of Enrique Camarena, as well as other charges. According to the "Selections from the Senate Committee Report on Drugs, Law Enforcement and Foreign Policy chaired by Senator John F. Kerry",  “the Honduran airline SETCO "was the principal company used by the Contras in Honduras to transport supplies and personnel for the FDN carrying at least a million rounds of ammunition, food, uniforms and other military supplies for the Contras from 1983 through 1985.  SETCO received funds for Contra supply operations from the Contra accounts established by Oliver North.”

Gangs 
Gang presence in Honduras is common where territory is controlled by members of rival gangs, the most powerful being the Mara Salvatrucha and the Barrio 18.  These gangs use violence and threats to enforce their power. Members of the community who do not pay their "war taxes" to the gangs for protection are threatened and often killed simply for their disobedience.  It is partly due to the gang culture in Honduras that many people have risked illegal immigration to the United States.

Assets of Banco Continental frozen 
Jaime Rosenthal's family owned Banco Continental, then the eighth largest bank in Honduras, which on October 7, 2015, had its assets frozen by the United States under the Foreign Narcotics Kingpin Designation Act on charges that they laundered money for drug traffickers.  Rosenthal has rebutted these charges, claiming, "we are sure that we will prevail in the trial because the accusations are false."  The Rosenthals have an extensive fortune worth $690 million which they have amassed through their management of Grupo Continental, a massive conglomerate of businesses which includes the Banco Continental, a meat packing plant, and an alligator skin export company, among others.  Specifically, the Rosenthal family has been accused by the United States for dealing with Cachiros, one of the largest drug transport clans in Central America.  The Cachiros group was run by the Rivera Maradiaga family who went on the run after being specifically targeted by the United States Department of the Treasury and in early 2015, turned their top members in to US authorities.  Jaime Rosenthal, at 79 years old is currently under house arrest in San Pedro Sula, Honduras awaiting trial in the United States. Rosenthal died of a heart attack in 2019 in San Pedro Sula.

Regional variations
Although Honduras is among the most violent countries in the world, crime and murders are not spread around all the country. In 2015, Tegucigalpa, San Pedro Sula and La Ceiba suffered more than 40% of the homicides in the country. The main reason for the concentrated violence is that these are the cities where the majority of Mara Salvatrucha and Barrio 18 members live. Violence rises from fights between the gangs to see who gains control over these regions.

Outside of these three main cities rate of homicides is much lower. Usually what happens in these regions is that a single armed group achieves a certain level of control over the population, so gangs do not fight against each other. The residents of these areas have reported to feel safer in these neighborhoods rather than in homicide hot spots, regardless of crimes like assaults, extortions or robbery still taking place.

Effects of crime on migration
The rise of violence has had a considerable impact on Honduran migration. In the past, the reason behind Central Americans traveling to the U.S. was merely economic. Young men traveled in search of the American Dream and sent revenues to their families back in Honduras. Today the main causes of migration are violence and crime. Another aspect of Central American migration that has changed is that migrants are no longer primarily men, but also women, teenagers and even children. Whole families travel from Honduras to the U.S. in search for a more peaceful life. By 2015 174,000 people, 4% of the country's households, had left Honduras.

For several years, Honduras sent more unaccompanied minors to the United States than any other Central American country. But since the murder rate began decreasing in 2011, the number of children traveling alone has also been reduced by half.  Therefore, Honduras is now third  on the list of countries whence unaccompanied Central American minors  fled, totaling around 18,000 in 2016. Sixty percent of unaccompanied minors report  that they are fleeing violence,  including physical violence, threats or extortion

Crime prevention
The United States Agency for International Development and the Bureau of International Narcotics and Law Enforcement Affairs have joined efforts to reduce the crime rate in Honduras. The U.S. has sent $200 million dollars in aid to Honduras since 2009. These organizations started sending economic aid when the Honduran coup d'état took place. In 2015 around $18 million dollars went to the Honduran police and military. However, even though the aid has been constant since 2009, in the summer of 2016 there was a bill introduced in Congress to cut the funding given to Honduras. The reason behind the suspension of the aid is the corruption and human rights violations that the money causes when given to the military or the police.

Other ways in which the aid has been distributed is through programs that identify children who present risk factors of joining gangs (such as a violent family environment, drug or alcohol abuse or being a victim of crime) and giving them counseling. This program, run by Creative Associates International, has proven to be successful;  77% of the children that attend this program do not get involved in crime or substance abuse after going through it. Another tactic has been creating centers that promote vocational training, these institutions provide mentors to Hondurans, teaches them skills to become barbers, electricians or bakers and then helps them to find jobs. Another contribution from the US government is funding the nonprofit Association for a More Just Society which focuses on creating the conditions for crimes to be prosecuted.

In Honduras, only 6% of collected taxes are spent in programs that reduce or prevent violence. $125 is the amount of money invested by each economically active member of the population (EAP) in terms of the national security budget. In contrast with Nicaragua where each EAP contributes with $497.

Mano Dura Laws 
In 2003, the Honduran government introduced the Mano Dura (literally tough hand) laws, which were zero-tolerance in nature and aimed to reduce social violence and restore public security. These laws allowed gang members to be incarcerated simply for their association with the gang.

Honduran police officers can arrest and subsequently place in prison anyone at all related to gangs through indicators such as tattoos, baggy clothing, or even typical gang positions on street corners. To avoid being detected by police officers, members of gangs have been forced to change their territorial strategies.  Since tattoos are such an easy way to identify a gang member, gangs have been forced to wear clothes covering their tattoos and to adopt a more casual appearance.  Tattoos are significant to gangs because they mark each member as property, just as graffiti marks a group's territory in the context of cities.  Each tattoo tells a gang member's story and each has its own meaning, but the appearance given off serves to indicate dominance, which explains partly why these men can be so influential.

Although these laws were introduced with the intention of reducing gang violence, there is little evidence to suggest that they have been effective.  Aside from an initial reduction in crime, the laws have not managed to significantly address the problem.  In fact, the Mano Dura laws have had some unintended consequences.  First, the zero-tolerance policies have forced many gang members to seek protection with members of their gang in other countries such as El Salvador.  Transnational gang relations have grown tremendously since the implementation of these laws, as evidenced by Mara Salvatrucha's extensive reach, spanning through the United States and even reaching cities in Canada.  The Mara Salvatrucha have taken to public violence to express their opposition to the laws.  On December 24, 2004, a year after the introduction of the Mano Dura, members of MS-13 shot up a bus, killing 28 people and wounding 14.  The perpetrators left a note not only claiming opposition to the death penalty, a major campaign issue in the upcoming presidential election and a large component of Mano Dura, but also promising more violence, warning that "people should take advantage of this Christmas, because the next one will be worse."  Outbursts such as these suggest that zero-tolerance policies have promoted further extremism in a country shrouded by gang violence.

Another reason the Mano Dura policies have struggled to accomplish their goals is that the prison system in Honduras is not built to accommodate the increased volume of incarcerated individuals.  Individual prisoner confinement is absent from the Honduran penal code, and this facilitates the grouping of prisoners and overcrowding of prisons.  Prison overcrowding has in some ways made it easier for gangs to function because in many prisons there are not enough guards to safely monitor the prisoners.  According to the CPTRT (Center for Prevention, Treatment and Rehabilitation of Victims of Torture and their Relatives) in 2004, there were 1,272 prison guards to attend to 10,300 inmates, which gives each guard the impossible task of tending to 8 inmates. To maintain a basic level of security, the guards and inmates have agreed upon a prison order which allows prisoners a surprising amount of freedom but at the very least keeps them inside the confines of the prison.  With more freedom inside the prisons, gang leaders can control the sale of food, commodities, and even the reception of visitors.  In addition, given the relative security of their position in prison, they can safely organize and plan their criminal strategies.  Another concern raised about these laws is their potential to be arbitrarily manipulated by law enforcement officials.  Since people can be arrested for simple tattoos or hand gestures, police have to be trusted to correctly and fairly prosecute gang members.  This process has clogged the judicial system to the point that the defendants are not always afforded fair trials.

Leaded Gasoline 

Kevin Drum points out that Honduras had the highest concentration of lead per gallon of gasoline in the world in the early 1990s.  Lead was eliminated in 1996.  Drum estimates that based on a lead–crime hypothesis, violence should peak between 2014 and 2024, and that another five to ten years after the peak will be needed to see a decline in violence.

See also 
 Femicides in Honduras

References